Commatica pterygota is a moth in the family Gelechiidae. It was described by Edward Meyrick in 1929. It is found in Amazonas, Brazil.

References 

Commatica
Moths described in 1929